Stalling Busk is one of three settlements around Semer Water in the Richmondshire district of  North Yorkshire   in the small dale of Raydale just off from Wensleydale, England. The hamlet lies to the immediate south of the lake.

As well as the Grade II listed St Matthew's church, Stalling Busk has a second church which can be found on a short walk towards Semer Water.

References

External links

Villages in North Yorkshire
Wensleydale